Załęże (German: Zalenze) is a district of Katowice, located in the north-western part of the city, in the central part of the Upper Silesian conurbation, on the Rawa river. It runs along Gliwicka street characteristic tortuous course of the city center to the border of Chorzów.

It is one of the oldest districts of Katowice, which dates back to the thirteenth century. By the end of the eighteenth century the community was an agricultural character, when it began to develop coal mining, iron and zinc industry, which enabled rapid population growth. In 1924 Załęże became a district of Katowice. After the collapse of the major industrial plants in the early twenty-first century Załęże became the center of a residential and service. At the end of 2007, the district had 11 569 inhabitants.

Development depends to a large extent are townhouses and familoks from the turn of the nineteenth and twentieth centuries, as well as residential buildings and services created after World War II. The most valuable objects in Załęże are neo-Gothic Saint Joseph's Church and the Palace in Załęże, the remains of a former farm. Załęże is very well connected by the A4 motorway and Drogowa Trasa Średnicowa runs through Załęże, as well as the international E 30 railway line and tram line .

Districts of Katowice